The Woman in the Web is a 1918 American drama film serial directed by Paul Hurst and David Smith. It was the 9th of 17 serials released by The Vitagraph Company of America. This World War I period serial about a Russian princess and the overthrow of the Tsar introduced the concept of the Red Menace to serials. The serial is now considered to be a lost film.

Cast 
 Hedda Nova as Princess Olga Muratoft
 J. Frank Glendon as Jack Lawford
 Robert Bradbury as Baron Kovsky (credited as Ronald Bradbury)
 Otto Lederer as Colonel Bormsk
 Chet Ryan as Ivan, the Cossack
 Hoot Gibson as Vassily, Ivan's Brother
 Patricia Palmer as Countess Irsky
 George Kuwa

Chapters 

 Caught in the Web
 The Open Switch
 The Speeding Doom
 The Clutch of Terror
 The Hand of Mystery
 Full Speed Ahead
 The Crater of Death
 The Plunge of Horror
 The Fire Trap
 Out of the Dungeon
 In the Desert's Grip
 Hurled to Destruction
 The Hidden Menace
 The Crash of Fate
 Out of the Web

Reception 
Like many American films of the time, A Woman in the Web was subject to cuts by city and state film censorship boards. For example, the Chicago Board of Censors cut, in Chapter 4, Reel 1, the man attacking and binding young woman on the boat, and choking scene on top of cabin; in Chapter 5, Reel 1, two views of men shooting and men falling from automobile and, Reel 2, actual cutting of handbag cord and taking handbag; in Chapter 7, Reel 2, binding man at point of gun and letting man down crater by rope; in Chapter 8, Reel 1, the intertitle "Now talk or we'll kill you", two scenes of threatening man with knife, Reel 2, two scenes of bomb throwing from airplane and shooting at automobile; in Chapter 11, Reel 1, all train holdup scenes to include scenes of passengers with hands up, shooting, man with gun, and shooting at automobile, and, Reel 2, all views of man about to be hanged from tree to include two closeups and one distant view; in Chapter 12, Reel 1, four scenes of man with rope around neck, the intertitle "We all was about to have a necktie party", and two scenes of man falling from horse; in Chapter 14, Reel 1, shooting scene in which man falls, and, in Chapter 15, Reel 2, binding of young woman, closeup of choking man.

See also 
 Hoot Gibson filmography
 List of film serials
 List of film serials by studio
 List of lost films

References

External links 
 

1918 films
1918 drama films
1918 lost films
Silent American drama films
American black-and-white films
American silent serial films
Films directed by David Smith (director)
Films set in Russia
Lost American films
Vitagraph Studios film serials
Lost drama films
1910s American films